Jeypore Evangelical Lutheran Church is a major Lutheran Christian denomination in India. It was established in 1882. At that time, the founder of The Schleswig Holstein Evangelical Lutheran Mission Society of Germany (SHELM) in Germany was Pastor Christian Jensen, who was praying for the people of India. Pioneer missionaries Rev. Ernest Pohl and Rev. Herman Bothmann came to India and reached the Koraput district of Odisha on 31 May 1882 and started mission work.

Foundation 

In late 19th century, when the missionaries arrived, they faced several challenges; one of them was laying the foundation of a church. At first they visited the king of Bastar state in Jagdalpur to seek approval for constructing a church and preaching Christianity in the region but were denied permission for the purpose. However, they later went to the neighbouring Jeypore state which was ruled by Maharaja Vikram Dev III and he granted them the permission and a plot where accordingly, the JEL Church was constructed in 1909.

The Germans were able to learn the local language, culture, customs, and the traditional system of the natives. The first woman, Asimuti Behera of the village Joba under the Kotpad mission station, was baptized by the missionary Timmke on 6 December 1886. A minority of local populace also volunteered for the mission programmes.

Service 
Apparently, it was from Jeypore Evangelical Lutheran Church that Christianity spread to other parts of southern Odisha such as Malkangiri, Nabarangpur, and Rayagada. Subsequently, the community members set up three major Christian hospitals in Bissam Cuttack, Nabarangpur, and Lamtaput in Koraput district to serve people from all religious backgrounds.

Now the church has more than 250,000 members. It has its own rules and regulations approved by IGR of Odisha, as per the society registration act of 1952, and the synod has four elected officers: Bishop, Synod Chairman, Secretary, and Treasurer. They serve for a term of four years. The current office holders are as Bishop of JELC,Rt. Rev. Bidhan Kumar Nayak, Synod Chairman Rev Anant Nag, Secretary Mr Praful Bhatra, Treasurer Mr Jasbir Paul.The headquarters of JELC function in Pohl & Bhothmann Bhavan, JELC central office, pin code -764001.

Jeypore Evangelical Lutheran Church.is associated with the National Council of Churches in India, United Evangelical Lutheran Church in India, Lutheran World Federation, and World Council of Churches.

JELC has its unofficial Oriya-language Lutheran Hymns Book Android App, offered by Premasis Satman.

See also 

 Christianity in Odisha
 Christianity in India
 Martin Luther

References
Notes

Further reading

External links

Lutheran World Federation members
Lutheranism in India
Affiliated institutions of the National Council of Churches in India
Lutheran denominations
Organisations based in Odisha
Christianity in Odisha
Education in Odisha
Schools in Colonial India
1882 establishments in India